Faucett Perú Flight 251 refers to a Boeing 737-200 that was operating a domestic scheduled Lima–Arequipa–Tacna passenger service and crashed on 29 February 1996, while completing the first leg, on approach to Rodríguez Ballón International Airport. All 123 passengers and crew aboard the aircraft lost their lives in the accident. It is the deadliest aviation accident that occurred on Peruvian soil.

Aircraft 

The aircraft involved in the accident was a Boeing 737-222, tail number OB-1451, c/n 19072, that had its maiden flight on 21 October 1968. Equipped with Pratt & Whitney JT8D-7B engines, the airplane started its commercial career on 28 October 1968, when it was delivered new to United Airlines and registered N9034U. Re-registered N73714 on 14 June 1971, Aloha Airlines took possession of the airplane until late , when it was transferred to Air California with the same registration. Following the absorption of AirCal into American Airlines, the airplane continued its career with this carrier until Braniff Airways received it, with the same registration, on 2 March 1989, later going to AL AC 2 Corp, on 15 May 1990. Finally, the aircraft was delivered to Faucett on 15 July 1991, and registered OB-1451. The airframe was  old at the time of the accident.

Description 

Inbound from Jorge Chávez International Airport, the aircraft was on a VOR/DME approach to Rodríguez Ballón International Airport's runway 09, at night, in rain and mist, with thunderstorms reported in the area. The crew had been issued an outdated barometric altimeter setting after bypassing an ILS signal, causing them to fly almost  lower than the altitude they believed they were flying at. The flightcrew asked for the lights of the runway to be brightened as they could not see them when they should on normal approach, receiving a response from air traffic controllers that they were at full intensity. The aft section broke off on impact, and the main fuselage section continued to fly past the initial ridge and impacted near the top of the second one. The tail section fell into a crevasse between the two ridges.

There were 123 people aboard the aircraft, of whom 117 were passengers. The nationalities of the victims were as follows:

See also 

 List of accidents and incidents involving commercial aircraft

Notes

References

Further reading

Faucett 251
Airliner accidents and incidents involving controlled flight into terrain
Aviation accidents and incidents in 1996
Aviation accidents and incidents in Peru
Faucett Perú accidents and incidents
1996 in Peru
February 1996 events in South America
1996 disasters in Peru